Laocheng is a district of Luoyang in Henan, China.

Laocheng District's history could be retrospect to BC 1042 the Xizhou Dynasty. Lao in Chinese means "old", and cheng means "city, downtown", so Laocheng's original meaning is "old downtown". Laocheng is a historical district and a cultural and business center.

Administrative divisions
As 2012, this district is divided to 6 subdistricts.
Subdistricts

Xibeiyu Subdistrict
Xinanyu Subdistrict
Dongbeiyu Subdistrict
Dongnanyu Subdistrict,
Xiguan Subdistrict
Nanguanlu Subdistrict

References

Districts of Luoyang